Daniel James "Danny" Collins (born 7 October 1970) is an Australian sprint canoeist who competed from the early 1990s to the mid-2000s (decade). Competing in four Summer Olympics, he won two medals in the K-2 500 m event with a silver in 2000 and a bronze in 1996, with canoeing partner Andrew Trim.

Collins also won four medals at the ICF Canoe Sprint World Championships with a gold (K-2 500 m: 1997), a silver (K-1 500 m: 1994), and two bronzes (K-1 500 m: 1993, K-2 500 m: 1999).

References
 
 
 

1970 births
Australian Institute of Sport canoeists
Australian male canoeists
Canoeists at the 1992 Summer Olympics
Canoeists at the 1996 Summer Olympics
Canoeists at the 2000 Summer Olympics
Canoeists at the 2004 Summer Olympics
Living people
Olympic canoeists of Australia
Olympic silver medalists for Australia
Olympic bronze medalists for Australia
Olympic medalists in canoeing
ICF Canoe Sprint World Championships medalists in kayak
Medalists at the 2000 Summer Olympics
Medalists at the 1996 Summer Olympics
20th-century Australian people